Jiaochangkou  is an interchange station between Line 1 and Line 2 of Chongqing Rail Transit in Chongqing Municipality, China, which opened in 2004. It is located in Yuzhong District.

Station structure

Line 1

Line 2

References

Yuzhong District
Railway stations in China opened in 2004
Chongqing Rail Transit stations
Railway stations in Chongqing